= Le Rugbynistère =

French website

- Available in: French
- Founded: Toulouse, (2008)
- Area served: Worldwide
- Website: Le Rugbynistère
- Launched: November, 2008
- Current status: Active

Le Rugbynistère is a French website about rugby union. The name "Rugbynistère" is made of the words "rugby" and ministry (ministère in French), put together to create the Ministry of Rugby.

== History ==
The website was released in 2008, November, and born thanks to the will of two friends to share their passion, both for rugby union and the web : Maxime Rouquié (rugby referee) and Nicolas Rousse (rugby union player). The goal was to create a perpetual place to share with other rugby union fans like we do after the games around the pitch. People can cross react after, before or during the games, using Facebook, or directly on the website.

The Rugbynistère is now visited by several thousands of readers each day, and is still growing.

== Rugbynistère's divisions ==
=== Website ===
Videos, transfers, picks, Top 14, Pro D2, Super Rugby, Aviva Premiership, Heineken Cup, Six Nations Championship, Rugby World Cup, and others competitions.

=== Shop ===
A rugby union shop : Le Rugbynistère designs and sells tee shirts in the most traditional rugby union spirit.

=== Blog ===
The blog is dedicated to non-rugby topics, games and competitions arranged by le Rugbynistère within the community, etc. in other words, a place where the founders talk about their audience, and people around them (such as other bloggers), and sometimes even themselves, always following the rugby spirit rules.

=== Rugby Community (Social network) ===
Thanks to the community section, users can create a personal profile, get (back) in touch with other clubs and/or players.

== See also ==
- Top 14
- Aviva Premiership
- L'Équipe
